Stalin José Rivas (born 5 August 1971 in San Félix, Venezuela) is a Venezuelan former footballer who played as a midfielder. He is described as "the most naturally talented Venezuelan footballer of all time".

Club career
During his professional career, Rivas played for several clubs in Latin America and Belgium, including Caracas Fútbol Club, Club Deportivo Los Millonarios and Standard Liège.

International career
Rivas received 34 caps, scoring 3 goals, for the Venezuela national football team between 1989 and 1996.

International goals

|- bgcolor=#DFE7FF
| 1. || 25 June 1989 || Pueblo Nuevo, San Cristóbal, Venezuela ||  || 3–0 || 3–0 || Friendly
|- bgcolor=#DFE7FF
| 2. || 21 May 1993 || El Campín, Bogotá, Colombia ||  || 1–1 || 1-1 || Friendly
|- bgcolor=#DFE7FF
| 3. || 19 June 1993 || Estadio Bellavista, Ambato, Ecuador ||  || 1–2 || 2–2 || 1993 Copa América
|}

References

External links
 

1971 births
Living people
People from Ciudad Guayana
Venezuelan footballers
Venezuelan expatriate footballers
Venezuela international footballers
1989 Copa América players
1991 Copa América players
1993 Copa América players
1995 Copa América players
Association football midfielders
A.C.C.D. Mineros de Guayana players
Standard Liège players
K. Rupel Boom F.C. players
Minervén S.C. players
Caracas FC players
Millonarios F.C. players
Deportivo Italia players
Deportivo Táchira F.C. players
Belgian Pro League players
Venezuelan Primera División players
Expatriate footballers in Belgium
Expatriate footballers in Colombia
Venezuelan expatriate sportspeople in Colombia
Venezuelan football managers
Mineros de Guayana managers
Deportivo Anzoátegui managers
Asociación Civil Deportivo Lara managers